Rogier Alexander Hofman (born 5 September 1986) is a Dutch field hockey player. He was part of the Dutch national team for the 2007 World Championships in Mönchengladbach, where the team finished in a disappointing seventh place. He won a silver medal at the 2012 Olympics, placing fourth in 2016.

Hofman took up field hockey aged eight. In 2012, together with teammate Tim Jenniskens he launched the Sport Helps foundation, which organises sports events for disabled or seriously ill children.

References

External links

 

1981 births
Living people
Dutch male field hockey players
Olympic field hockey players of the Netherlands
People from Vught
Field hockey players at the 2012 Summer Olympics
Olympic silver medalists for the Netherlands
Olympic medalists in field hockey
Medalists at the 2012 Summer Olympics
Field hockey players at the 2016 Summer Olympics
HC Bloemendaal players
2006 Men's Hockey World Cup players
2010 Men's Hockey World Cup players
2014 Men's Hockey World Cup players
20th-century Dutch people
21st-century Dutch people